The 2020–21 Colgate Raiders Men's ice hockey season was the 91st season of play for the program and the 60th season in the ECAC Hockey conference. The Raiders represented the Colgate University and played their home games at Class of 1965 Arena, and were coached by Don Vaughan, in his 28th season as their head coach.

Season
As a result of the ongoing COVID-19 pandemic the entire college ice hockey season was delayed. Because the NCAA had previously announced that all winter sports athletes would retain whatever eligibility they possessed through at least the following year, none of Colgate's players would lose a season of play. However, the NCAA also approved a change in its transfer regulations that would allow players to transfer and play immediately rather than having to sit out a season, as the rules previously required.

The start to Colgate's season was a bit rough as the team won 1 of their first six games. They recovered afterwards and nearly reached a .500 record by early February but the team flagged afterwards and ended the season last in the conference. The Raiders met St. Lawrence in the ECAC Tournament and outplayed the Saints but still managed to lose 4–5 in overtime. The poor finish should be taken with a grain of salt, however, as eight of the twelve ECAC teams had cancelled their seasons. This resulted in Colgate playing 21 out of 22 games against Clarkson, Quinnipiac and St. Lawrence, two of which were ranked throughout the season. The only real takeaway from the season for Colgate was that the team has some work to do if they want to compete against Clarkson and Quinnipiac.

Mitchel Benson, William Friend, and Henry Marshall sat out the season.

Departures

Recruiting

Roster
As of December 17, 2020.

Standings

Schedule and Results

|-
!colspan=12 style=";" | Regular Season

|-
!colspan=12 style=";" |

Scoring statistics

Goaltending statistics

Rankings

USCHO did not release a poll in week 20.

Awards and honors

References

Colgate Raiders men's ice hockey seasons
Colgate Raiders
Colgate Raiders
Colgate Raiders
2021 in sports in New York (state)
2020 in sports in New York (state)